In 2012, China became the third nation to send women into space with its own space program, after the Soviet Union/Russia and the United States, 49 years after the first female cosmonaut, Valentina Tereshkova.

History

Following the successful piloted flight of Shenzhou 5 in October 2003, China announced plans to send a woman into space as well. Gu Xiulian, president of the All-China Women's Federation (ACWF), told a gathering that she proposed that women, too, should be trained for space missions after China's first piloted space trip.

Initially, the criteria for women to be selected, included having been married, having had a child, having no bad health problems. The marriage and having had children criteria were later said to have been dropped.

On 16 June 2012, Major Liu Yang was the first Chinese woman launched into space aboard the Shenzhou 9 with two male counterparts to the Chinese space station Tiangong-1. Liu was not drawn from the fighter pilot cadre, but instead is a veteran PLAAF transport pilot. The mission took off at 6:37 p.m. (10:37 UTC) from the Jiuquan Satellite Launch Center on the edge of the Gobi Desert. She launched on the 49th anniversary of the launch of Vostok 6, the first spaceshot of a woman, Valentina Tereshkova.

On 16 June 2013, the 50th anniversary of the launch of Vostok 6, two women were in space, one of them Chinese, the second Chinese woman in space, Wang Yaping, aboard Tiangong-1 on the 3-man Shenzhou 10 mission, and Karen Nyberg on the 6-man Expedition 36 aboard the International Space Station. The mission had lifted off on 11 June 2013.

Zhou Chengyu, a  24-year-old Chinese engineer, was a commander in the Chang'e 5 Moon exploration programme, launched on 23 November 2020.

On 15 October 2021, Colonel Wang Yaping was the first Chinese woman to travel twice to space aboard Shenzhou 13 with two male counterparts to the Tiangong space station. The mission took off at 00:23 a.m. (16:23 UTC) from the Jiuquan Satellite Launch Center on the edge of the Gobi Desert.

List of Chinese women in space by mission
These women are Chinese who have flown into space

Firsts and records
Updated as of December 4, 2022.

See also 

 People's Liberation Army Astronaut Corps
 List of Chinese astronauts
 List of female astronauts

References

Citations

Sources 

 

Space program of the People's Republic of China
Chinese women
Women in space